Riki R. Nelson is a contemporary American oil painter known for her realistic and surreal portraits of jazz musicians, bar patrons, city street scenes. In a 2008 review, her work was described as, "realistic in the physical sense and raw in the spiritual sense, capturing the discordant element of self". Using traditional realism, which she complements with contemporary colors and compositions, she expresses a uniquely creative vision rooted in the elegance of traditional realism, while utilizing subtle surrealism to capture what she perceives as ‘the undercurrent of pathos’ in contemporary life. Nelson works exclusively in traditional oil and oil paint mediums.

Nelson is best known for her candid portraits of jazz musicians and singers. This body of work has brought her both review and numerous mentions. Her current work focuses on up market bar scenes - that often include glimpses of angels and other archetypal images - custom portraits, and city street scenes. She also does seasonal plein air paintings of the California coastline.

Early life and background
Nelson was born in Downey, California. She grew up between there and the San Francisco Bay Area with her parents, Pearl and Ray Nelson, and her younger brother, Dr. Eric R. Nelson. She was painting and drawing from an early age and was further encouraged in this by her mother's love of the arts and poetry and her families’ now retired fine art and antique business; Pearl Antiques of Los Gatos.

Career
In the 1980s and early 1990s Nelson worked as a professional art consultant and sales manager in fine art galleries. Her list of gallery affiliations included; Dyansen Gallery in Carmel, Chabot Gallery in Campbell and Martin Lawrence Gallery in San Jose. This experience gave her an understanding of the art business ‘from both sides of the canvas’ and has given her a very positive reputation in the art industry. Her work has been carried and featured by the Peabody Fine Art Gallery of Menlo Park & Los Gatos since 2005.

Nelson has donated both time and art to charities over the years including :The Los Gatos Art Association, The American Pen Women, Pacific Autism, and the organizations that sponsor Jazz on the Plazz in Los Gatos, CA. Nelson has given numerous talks to art groups to help visual artists better understand how to present their art to galleries and the public.

References

External links 
 
 [2006 Art Business News Gallery Events section – photo and listing]
 One of the two Visual Artists to be honored this year for their achievement in visual art by the National League of American Pen Women, Santa Clara Valley Chapter.
 2005 –"Beauty in the Night, Scenes of the City" : Peabody Fine Art Gallery of Los Gatos oil paintings of local Jazz and street scenes. Month-long exhibition and solo artist reception.
 Current Gallery Representation : 2016 Peabody Fine Art Gallery, Menlo Park Ca.
 Studied for two years at The Neoteric Renaissance School of Art - classical drawing and painting under Florence Academy Artists Lisa Silas, Matthew Riggs and Johnathan Chorn.
 Studied under portrait artists Linda Harris and Heidi Buckner.

Living people
20th-century American women artists
American women painters
People from Downey, California
21st-century American women artists
Year of birth missing (living people)